Midlands–North-West is a constituency of the European Parliament in Ireland. It elects four Members of the European Parliament (MEPs) using the single transferable vote form of proportional representation (PR-STV).

History and boundaries

The Constituency Commission proposed in its 2013 report that at the next European Parliament election a new constituency called Midlands–North-West be created, consisting of the old North-West constituency, with the exception of County Clare which was moved to the South constituency; as well the northern and central Leinster part of the East constituency. The report proposed changes to the constituencies of Ireland so as to reduce the total number of MEPs from 12 to 11, due to the accession of Croatia to the European Union. The Irish Times criticised the wide geographic spread of the constituency, calling it "a heterogeneous mish-mash of counties with little historic or cultural connection to each other." It was nicknamed "Malin M50" for its wide spread, from the suburbs of Dublin to the Atlantic seaboard.

For the 2019 European Parliament election, a reapportionment following Brexit and the loss of 73 MEPs from the United Kingdom gave two additional seats to Ireland. Following a recommendation of the Constituency Commission, counties Laois and Offaly were moved to the South constituency, with Midlands–North-West maintaining its 4 seats.

The constituency comprises the counties of Cavan, Donegal, Galway, Kildare, Leitrim, Longford, Louth, Mayo, Meath, Monaghan, Roscommon, Sligo and Westmeath; and the city of Galway.

The main urban areas of Midlands–North-West (by population size) are Galway, Drogheda, Dundalk, Navan, Newbridge, Naas, Athlone, Mullingar, Celbridge and Letterkenny.

Per the 2016 census, it has a population of 1,523,517.

MEPs

Elections

2019 election

2014 election

See also
European Parliament constituencies in the Republic of Ireland

Footnotes

References

European Parliament constituencies in the Republic of Ireland
2014 establishments in Ireland
Constituencies established in 2014